Diffutin is a flavan, a type of flavonoid. It can be found in Canscora diffusa and in Hoppea dichotoma.

Metabolism 
Diffutin is a glucoside of diffutidin.

References 

O-methylated flavans
Flavonoid glucosides